Rajendra Nath Lahiri (29 June 1901 — 17 December 1927), known simply as Rajendra Lahiri, was an Indian revolutionary, who was a mastermind behind the Kakori conspiracy and Dakshineshwar bombing. He was active member of Hindustan Republican Association aimed at ousting the British from India.

Early life
Rajendra Lahiri was born on 29 June 1901 in the village of Lahiri Mohanpur in a Brahmin family of Pabna District, Bengal Presidency (now in Bangladesh). His father, Kshitish Mohan Lahiri, owned a large estate there.

Dakshineswar bomb incident
Lahiri took part in the Dakshineswar bombing incident and absconded. He went to Banaras and started studying. He was a M.A. student in Department of History, Banaras Hindu University when the revolutionary activities started in United Provinces (now Uttar Pradesh). He joined the Hindustan Republican Association along with some of his Bengali friends.

Kakori conspiracy
He was Mastermind behind the Kakori train robbery on 8 August 1925. He was arrested and tried in the previous bomb case of Dakshineswar in Bengal and sent to jail for ten years rigorous imprisonment. When the legal proceedings started in Lucknow for the train robbery, he was also included in the Kakori conspiracy case and tried with several other revolutionaries.

Death
He was found guilty after a long trial and was hanged in the Gonda district jail on 17 December 1927, two days before the scheduled date, along with Thakur Roshan Singh, Ashfaq Ullah and Ram Prasad Bismil.

References

1900s births
1927 deaths
Indian revolutionaries
Executed Indian people
20th-century executions by British India
People from Pabna District
20th-century Bengalis
People executed by British India by hanging
Executed revolutionaries
Hindustan Socialist Republican Association
Banaras Hindu University alumni